The Shadowless Tower is a 2023 Chinese drama film written and directed by Korean-Chinese filmmaker Zhang Lü and stars Xin Baiqing, Tian Zhuangzhuang and Huang Yao. The film depicts the warm story of people healing and accompanying each other exhibiting family bond and love. 

It is selected to compete for the Golden Bear at the 73rd Berlin International Film Festival, where it had its world premiere on 18 February 2023.

Synopsis

Name of the film
The name of film is from a landmark of a 13th-century Buddhist temple in the Xicheng District of Beijing, the White Pagoda. The eccentric design of temple, makes it hard to see its shadow. This has given rise to the local legend that its shade can actually be found some two thousand miles away in Tibet, the temple’s spiritual home. It is used as imperfect metaphor for a lifestage of the protagonist. Hence the name: The Shadowless Tower.

A middle-aged man living alone in Beijing, met young photographer at work. He learned the whereabouts of his father who had lost contact with him for more than forty years. Encouraged by the photographer he faces his father and regained the long-lost father-son relationship.

Cast
 Xin Baiqing as Gu Wentong
 Huang Yao as Ouyang Wenhui, photographer
 Tian Zhuangzhuang as Gu Yunlai
 Nanji as Nanji 
 Li Qinqin as Gu Wenhui
 Wang Hongwei as Li Jun
 Wang Yiwen as Xiao Xiao

Release
The Shadowless Tower had its world premiere on 18 February 2023 at the 73rd Berlin International Film Festival.

The Berlin- and Lyon-based international sales agent Film Boutique has sales right for the film.

Reception

On the review aggregator Rotten Tomatoes website, the film has an approval rating of 89% based on 9 reviews, with an average rating of 7.3/10. On Metacritic, it has a weighted average score of 78 out of 100 based on 4 reviews, indicating "Generally Favorable Reviews".

Jessica Kiang reviewing at Berlin Film Festival, for Variety praised the cinematography and music writing, "The warmth of Piao Songri’s photography is a constant, as is his facility for the offbeat framing of even the most everyday encounter, using doorways or reflections or a quickly shifting focus." Kiang added, "And the soundtrack is equally witty, composer Xiao's delicately used score has a signature flourish". Concluding Kiang wrote, "The film ambles onward, it reveals its arcs of change not in dramatic showdowns or sudden revelations, but in ellipses, in the occasional mysterious fold in chronology and, most rewardingly, in the casual, unforced repetition of certain motifs."<ref name="rev:var">{{cite web|url=https://variety.com/2023/film/reviews/the-shadowless-tower-review-bai-ta-zhi-guang-1235520742/  |title=The Shadowless Tower' Review: An Unusually Polite Midlife Crisis Makes for a Wry and Wistful Chinese Charmer |first=Jessica |last= Kiang|date=18 February 2023|access-date=19 February 2023 |website=Variety}}</ref> David Rooney of The Hollywood Reporter'' calling the film a contemplative film of quiet rewards, stated, "Piao Songri’s loose, fluid camerawork trails the protagonist, played with soulful intelligence by Xin, there’s both a haunting sense of all that he’s lost and a newfound self-knowledge that perhaps might propel him forward with greater openness." Lee Marshall for ScreenDaily wrote in review that "The film’s delicacy of touch comes through not only in the bittersweet love story at its centre, but in a wealth of seemingly marginal details."

Accolades

References

External links
 
 The Shadowless Tower at Berlinale
 The Shadowless Tower at Douban 
 

2023 films
2020s Mandarin-language films
Chinese drama films
2023 drama films
Films directed by Zhang Lu
Films set in Beijing